Brentwood station is a light rail station on the Red Line of the CTrain between Dalhousie and University stations. The station connects also served by the MAX Orange, North Pointe, Foothills Medical Centre, Dalhousie, Chinook, Greenwood/Brentwood, Market Mall, Downtown West, Nolan Hill, and Valley Ridge bus routes.

Location and station layout 

The station has two tracks and a single island platform. Located to either side of the station is Crowchild Trail, with pedestrian overpasses connecting the station to either side of the road. To the southwest are the bus stations and a park and ride with 950 stalls. To the northeast are a Calgary Co-op and Brentwood Mall, and to the southwest there is the University Research Park.

The station itself is located in Varsity, with the communities of Varsity, Brentwood, and Charleswood being served by the station.

Architecture 
When the line was extended, Robert LeBlond from the firm LeBlond Partnership was asked to design the new station building. The transit designers knew that the Brentwood extension would be the last extension for many years, so they wanted an impressive design. LeBlond designed the building to resemble a grain elevator. The station building won the Portland Cement Award of Excellence for its use of concrete, and the Alberta Association of Architects successfully nominated the building for inclusion in the Chronicle of Significant Alberta Architecture.

History 
Brentwood station was proposed in a study by transit consultants Hawley Simpson and John F. Curtin entitled Transit for Calgary's Future. The study proposed a northwest-southeast line from Brentwood to Haysboro (the equivalent of Heritage station).

Brentwood station was created as part of a  extension that was opened on August 13, 1990. It would be the northwest terminus until 2003, when Dalhousie station was opened.

In 2008, the station registered an average of 14,900 boardings per weekday.

In May of 2010, the federal government announced that they would be cooperating with the municipal government to extend the station's platform to accommodate the new four-car trains.

In September 2020, the station's pedestrian bridges underwent a renovation, which included concrete rehabilitation and lighting upgrades along the stairs, ramps, and the bridge, and new handrails and guardrails. Renovation ended in winter of 2021.

Service 
The station connects to the 8 North Pointe/Foothills Medical Centre, 9 Dalhousie/Chinook, 38 Temple, 53 Greenwood/Brentwood, 65 Market Mall/Downtown West, 82 Nolan Hill, 408 Valley Ridge, and MAX Orange bus routes.

References

Bibliography
 

CTrain stations
Railway stations in Canada opened in 1990
1990 establishments in Alberta